The Girardoni air rifle was an air gun designed by Tyrolian inventor Bartolomeo Girardoni circa 1779. The weapon was also known as the Windbüchse ("wind rifle" in German). One of the rifle's more famous associations is its use on the Lewis and Clark Expedition to explore and map the Louisiana Purchase of 1803.

History and use

The Girardoni air rifle was in service with the Austrian army from 1780 to around 1815. Many references to the Girardoni air rifles mention lethal combat ranges of 125 to 150 yards and some extend that range considerably. The advantages of a high rate of fire, no smoke from propellants, and low muzzle report granted it acceptance. It did have problems and was eventually removed from service for several reasons decades after introduction. There was also a version sold to civilians after it was removed from military service. While the detachable air reservoir was capable of around 30 shots, it took nearly 1,500 strokes of a hand pump to fill those reservoirs. Later, a wagon-mounted pump was provided. The reservoirs, made from hammered sheet iron held together with rivets and sealed by brazing, proved very difficult to manufacture using the techniques of the period and were always in short supply.

In addition, the weapon was very delicate, and a small break in the reservoir could make it inoperable. It was also very different from any other weapon of the time, requiring extensive training to use.

The Lewis and Clark Expedition used the rifle in the demonstrations that they performed for nearly every Native American tribe they encountered on the expedition.

Design and capabilities

It fired a .46 or .51 caliber ball and had a tubular, spring-fed magazine with a capacity of 20 balls. Some of the weapons were also made using a gravity-fed magazine. Unlike its contemporary, muzzle-loading muskets, which required the rifleman to stand up to reload with powder and ball, the shooter could reload a ball from the magazine by pulling a transverse chamber bar out of the breech which allowed a ball to be supplied to it and which then rebounded back to its original position with the aid of a spring, all while lying down. Contemporary regulations of 1788 required that each rifleman, in addition to the rifle itself, be equipped with three compressed air reservoirs (two spare and one attached to the rifle), cleaning stick, hand pump, lead ladle, and 100 lead balls, 1 in the chamber, 19 in the magazine built into the rifle and the remaining 80 in four tin tubes. Equipment not carried attached to the rifle was held in a special leather knapsack. It was also necessary to keep the leather gaskets of the reservoir moist in order to maintain a good seal and prevent leakage.

The air reservoir was in the club-shaped stock. With a full air reservoir, the Girardoni air rifle had the capacity to shoot 30 shots at useful pressure. The power declined as the air reservoir was emptied. Design-wise, the air reservoir was similar to the disposable carbon dioxide cartridges used on some modern air guns.

Importance

The Girardoni air rifle was an important first. It was the first repeating rifle of a specific general kind to enter general military service. It was one of the first uses of a tubular magazine.

See also

 Weapons of the Austro-Hungarian Empire
 Kunitomo air rifle

References

External links

 Beeman's History on Austrian Large Bore Airguns
 I Benemeriti Di Cortina D’Ampezzo
  (original 1780 example)
 Girardoni air rifle as used by Lewis and Clark. A National Firearms Museum Treasure Gun.
  Girardoni air rifle

Italian inventions
1779 introductions
Air guns